Krempau (also Kremper Au) is a river of Schleswig-Holstein, Germany. It flows into the Stör in Borsfleth.

See also
List of rivers of Schleswig-Holstein

Rivers of Schleswig-Holstein
Rivers of Germany